Walter Colmes (1917–1988) was an American film director and producer sometimes billed as Walter S. Colmes. He directed six films between 1945 and 1947, including The Woman Who Came Back starring Nancy Kelly, Accomplice with Veda Ann Borg and The French Key with Evelyn Ankers, and produced ten films between 1943 and 1947.

External links
 Walter Colmes in the Internet Movie Database

American film directors
1917 births
1988 deaths